Two ships of the United States Navy have been named for the city of Shreveport, Louisiana.

United States Navy ship names
Shreveport, Louisiana